Kamber Arslan (born 5 January 1980 in Kayseri, Turkey) is a Turkish former football defender and defensive midfielder. He has played for Kayseri Erciyesspor in the TFF First League.

Club career
Arslan previously played for several seasons with Kayserispor.

Honours 
 Kayserispor
Turkish Cup (1): 2008

References

1980 births
Living people
Turkish footballers
Kayserispor footballers
Kayseri Erciyesspor footballers
Antalyaspor footballers
Süper Lig players
People from Kayseri

Association football midfielders